Tin Plavotić (born 30 June 1997) is a professional footballer who plays as a centre-back for Austrian Bundesliga club SV Ried. Born in Austria, he has represented Croatia at youth level.

Career
Plavotić began his career playing with the reserve sides Admira Wacker II and FC Schalke 04 II before joining English side Bristol City on 31 January 2017. He was immediately loaned out to League Two side Cheltenham Town, where he made his professional debut in a 1–1 draw against Newport County. Plavotić joined Barnet on loan on 31 January 2018. He made one appearance, at home to Notts County, but after the departure of Graham Westley, new manager Martin Allen announced that Plavotic's loan had been cancelled as there was not enough room for him due to the size of the squad.

On 26 September 2018, Plavotić signed for Floridsdorfer AC. On 28 May 2021, he moved to fellow league club SV Ried on a deal until June 2023.

References

External links
 

1997 births
Living people
Footballers from Vienna
Austrian people of Croatian descent
Association football central defenders
Austrian footballers
Croatian footballers
Croatia youth international footballers
FC Admira Wacker Mödling players
FC Schalke 04 II players
Bristol City F.C. players
Cheltenham Town F.C. players
Barnet F.C. players
Floridsdorfer AC players
SV Ried players
Austrian Regionalliga players
Regionalliga players
English Football League players
2. Liga (Austria) players
Austrian Football Bundesliga players
Croatian expatriate footballers
Expatriate footballers in Germany
Croatian expatriate sportspeople in Germany
Expatriate footballers in England
Croatian expatriate sportspeople in England